The discography of American rapper and songwriter Jarren Benton consists of four studio albums, one collaboration album, three mixtapes, two extended plays and 62 singles (including 28 singles as a featured artist).

Albums

Studio albums

Collaborative albums

Mixtapes

Extended plays

Singles

As lead artist

As featured artist

Guest appearances

References 

Hip hop discographies
Discographies of American artists